Topophilia (From Greek topos "place" and -philia, "love of") is a strong sense of place, which often becomes mixed with the sense of cultural identity among certain people and a love of certain aspects of such a place.

History of the term

Alan Watts's autobiography, In My Own Way (1972), starts with the sentence: "Topophilia is a word invented by the British poet John Betjeman for a special love for peculiar places."  But it was W. H. Auden who used the term in his 1948 introduction to John Betjeman's poetry book Slick but Not Streamlined, stressing that the term "has little in common with nature love" but depended upon a landscape infused with a sense of history.  The term later appeared in the French philosopher Gaston Bachelard's highly influential The Poetics of Space (1958).  Yi-Fu Tuan employed the term for the feeling-link between person and place as part of his development of a humanistic geography. James W. Gibson, in his book A Reenchanted World (2009) also argues that topophilia or "love of place" is a biologically based, close cultural connection to place.  Gibson says that such connections mostly have been destroyed in modernity but argues that "more and more people are trying to reinvent them."

In relation to local sports

Mike Cronin in his article "Enshrined in Blood the Naming of Gaelic Athletic Association Grounds and Clubs" (The Sports Historian, 18, 1) has noted the opportunities sport stadia have for topophilia. Referring to the work of sports geographer John Bale, he cites five metaphors that make stadiums particularly topophilic:

 They are 'sacred spaces' for their followers, particularly if euphoric or tragic incidents have taken place within them, such as the Hillsborough disaster.
 They often have 'scenic' qualities, such as the view of the Gateway Arch at Busch Stadium in St. Louis, Missouri.
 As a 'home' to the team and the fans, it can have psychological advantages to both.
 The stadium might be a 'tourist' attraction to visitors, a must-see venue.  Some stadiums, such as the Melbourne Cricket Ground have fee-charging tours when matches are not even occurring.
 Deep local pride and patriotism may be tied up with particular stadiums or arenas.

Use in the media

Topophilia, a feature-length documentary from 2015 by artist Peter Bo Rappmund that follows the Trans-Alaska Pipeline.

Dark side
Topophilia also has a darker side, serving as a motive force behind nationalism and social exclusion, and even extending sometimes to the nazist celebration of Blood and Soil.

See also

Footnotes

External links
Ogunseitan, Oladele A. "Topophilia and the Quality of Life", Environmental Health Perspectives 113(2), February 2005.

Cultural geography